All Got Our Runnins is the only EP released by UK act the Streets. Following the critical and commercial success of debut album Original Pirate Material, the EP was released exclusively as a digital download, distributed via iTunes and Napster, among others. It features a compilation of remixes and non-album tracks taken from the Streets' first four singles.

Track listing

References 

2003 debut EPs
The Streets albums
Hip hop EPs